V5, V-5, or V.5 may refer to:

Electronics and software
 CATIA V5, a multi-platform software suite
 Hanlin v5 Mini, an electronic book reading device
 Volari V5, a video card

Military
 V-5, the United States Navy's Naval Aviation Cadet program during 1935–1968

Music
 V5 (group), musical group
 V.5 (mixtape), the tenth mixtape by American rapper Lloyd Banks

Science and technology
 V.5, a withdrawn general-standard recommendation by the ITU Telecommunication Standardization Sector
 V, the EKG electrode placed in the fifth intercostal space in the mid-clavicular line
 V5 interface, a family of telephone network protocols defined by ETSI
 Middle temporal visual area (MT or V5), a region of extrastriate visual cortex

Transportation

Automobiles
 Brilliance V5, a Chinese compact SUV
 Changan Alsvin V5
 Chery V5, a Chinese compact MPV
 FAW Vita V5, a Chinese subcompact sedan
 GreenWheel V5, a Chinese subcompact electric crossover
 Mushtaq V5, a Pakistani commercial van
 Soueast V5, a Chinese compact sedan

Aviation
 Bailey V5 paramotor, a British paramotor
 Royal Aruban Airlines (IATA designator: V5), an airline based in Aruba

Engines
 V5 engine, a V form engine with five cylinders
 Bailey V5 engine

See also
 5V (disambiguation)